Prosperity is the state of having wealth or good fortune.

Prosperity may also refer to:

Places in the United States:
Prosperity, Florida, an unincorporated community
Prosperity, Indiana, an unincorporated town
Prosperity, Missouri, an unincorporated community
Prosperity, Pennsylvania, an unincorporated community
Prosperity, South Carolina, a town
Prosperity, West Virginia, a census-designated place
Prosperity, U.S. Virgin Islands, a settlement

In film and television:
Prosperity (film), starring Marie Dressler
Prosperity (Irish TV series), an Irish television drama series
Prosperity (Singaporean TV series), a Singaporean Chinese family drama

See also
As-Salam Palace, one of Saddam Hussein's palaces taken over by coalition forces and called "Camp Prosperity" or "Forward Operating Base Prosperity"
Prosper (disambiguation)